Robin Vanderbemden (born 10 February 1994) is a Belgian sprinter competing primarily in the 200 metres. He represented his country in the 4 × 400 metres relay at the 2015 World Championships and 2016 World Indoor Championships. He also competed at the 2020 Summer Olympics, in 200 m.

Competition record

Personal bests
Outdoor
200 metres – 20.93 (−0.2 m/s, Oordegem-Lede 2015)
400 metres – 46.10 (Tallinn 2015)
Indoor
60 metres – 6.68 (Ghent 2014)

See also
 Belgian men's 4 × 400 metres relay team

References

External links

1994 births
Living people
Belgian male sprinters
Place of birth missing (living people)
World Athletics Championships athletes for Belgium
World Athletics Championships medalists
European Championships (multi-sport event) gold medalists
European Athletics Championships medalists
Belgian Athletics Championships winners
Athletes (track and field) at the 2020 Summer Olympics
Olympic athletes of Belgium